Oodnadatta is a town and locality in South Australia.

Oodnadatta may also refer to:

South Australia
Oodnadatta (biogeographic subregion), a subregion of the Stony Plains bioregion
Oodnadatta Aboriginal School, an Aboriginal school
Oodnadatta Airport
Oodnadatta Track, a road
Oodnadatta railway station, a heritage listed railway station in Oodnadatta

Elsewhere
Oodnadatta, a crater on Mars

See also
Coober Pedy Oodnadatta One Day Mail Run